Getik (also, Alikhan) is a town in the Shirak Province of Armenia.

References 

Populated places in Shirak Province